It's Mashed Potato Time is the debut album by Dee Dee Sharp. It was released on Cameo Records in May 1962.

Track listing

References 

1962 debut albums
Cameo Records albums
Dee Dee Sharp albums